Georg Caspari (17 April 1683 – 12 April 1743) was a Baltic German academic.

Caspari was born in Riga, in Swedish Livonia, as the son of David Caspari, rector of Riga Cathedral. He studied at the University of Rostock, where he published De Descensu Christi ad Inferos in 1704 and De Testamentis Divinis in 1705. Caspari also published some of his father's papers after his death in 1702. After living for a while in Greifswald, Caspari returned to Riga in 1723 and served at the cathedral. He died in his hometown.

References

John McClintock. Cyclopaedia of Biblical, Theological, and Ecclesiastical Literature. Harper and Brothers. New York. 1889 
Johann Friedrich von Recke, Karl Eduard von Napiersky. Allgemeines Schriftsteller- und Gelehrten-Lexikon der Provinzen Livland, Esthland und Kurland. Johann Friedrich Steffenhagen und Sohn. Mitau. 1827  

1683 births
1743 deaths
Writers from Riga
People from Swedish Livonia
Baltic-German people
Academic staff of the University of Rostock
German Lutheran theologians
18th-century German Protestant theologians
German male non-fiction writers
University of Rostock alumni
18th-century German male writers